Boylove may refer to:
Boylove, a term used by pro-pedophile activists (i.e. North American Man/Boy Love Association)
Pederasty, a sexual relationship between a man and a boy
Boys' love, a genre of Japanese fictional media that features homoerotic relationship between male characters